Ryan Bailey (born August 28, 1975) is an American water polo player and Olympic silver medallist. He competed in the Summer Olympic games between 2000 and 2012.

School
Bailey went to Millikan High School in Long Beach, California, and attended UC Irvine in Irvine, California. In college he was a four-time All-American, tallied 104 goals in his senior season, and was awarded the Mountain Pacific Sports Federation Player of the Year in 1998.

Olympics
He was a member of the United States men's national water polo team for the 2000, 2004, 2008, and 2012 Summer Olympics. In the 2004 Athens Olympics, he scored two goals. In the 2012 London Olympics, he scored three goals. He was part of the team for the 2008 Beijing Olympics, where, in the championship game, the USA team won the silver medal, ultimately defeated by Hungary. This is the highest finish ever in the Summer Olympics for USA Water Polo. He was the leading scorer for the US team at the 2012 London Olympics with 13 goals.

Professional
Bailey has played professionally for a number of European water polo clubs, and played in two European Championships :
 2004: VK Jug Dubrovnik in Croatia
 2004–2005: Dynamo Moscow
 2005–2006: VK Jadran Split in Croatia
 2006: Panionios in Greece
 2007–2009: VK Partizan in Serbia

Awards
In 2019, Bailey was inducted into the USA Water Polo Hall of Fame.

See also
 List of Olympic medalists in water polo (men)
 List of players who have appeared in multiple men's Olympic water polo tournaments

References

External links
 

1975 births
Living people
American male water polo players
Water polo centre forwards
Millikan High School alumni
Water polo players at the 2000 Summer Olympics
Water polo players at the 2004 Summer Olympics
Water polo players at the 2008 Summer Olympics
Water polo players at the 2012 Summer Olympics
Water polo players at the 2011 Pan American Games
Olympic silver medalists for the United States in water polo
Medalists at the 2008 Summer Olympics
Pan American Games gold medalists for the United States
Pan American Games medalists in water polo
American water polo coaches
Medalists at the 2011 Pan American Games
21st-century American people